This is a list of episodes from the sixth season of Mannix.

Broadcast history
The season originally aired Sundays at 9:30-10:30 pm (EST) from September 17 to December 24, 1972 and at 8:30-9:30 pm (EST) from January 7 to March 11, 1973.

DVD release
The season was released on DVD by Paramount Home Video.

Episodes

References

Mannix seasons